Lê Huỳnh Đức (born April 20, 1972 in Ho Chi Minh City, Vietnam) is a Vietnamese football manager and former footballer. He is currently serving as technical director for V.League 1 side Saigon. Huỳnh Đức is a former member of the Vietnam national football team, with whom he earned 60 caps (a national record), as well as being its top scorer. He became the first Vietnamese footballer to be signed to a club outside of Vietnam when he signed on for a year's stint with Chongqing Lifan. In 2009, he became both the youngest coach to win the V-League's "Best Coach of the Month" award, and the first coach to win the award in three consecutive months. His coaching style is best known for its toughness and discipline, which is credited with helping SHB Đà Nẵng emerge as champions in the 2009 V-League season.

Career

Player
Lê Huỳnh Đức began his career as a professional football player in 1991, playing with the 7th Military Region's football club in Ho Chi Minh City. The following year he moved to the Ho Chi Minh City Police Football Club, where he had his most productive stint, staying with the club until 2000. He also began playing with Vietnam's national football team during this time, joining in 1995 and playing through until 2000, returning in 2002 and 2004. He earned a record 60 caps with the national team, as well as being its top scorer. In 2001, he made Vietnamese football history by becoming the first Vietnamese footballer signed to play abroad when he joined Chongqing Lifan, a Chinese Super League club. He returned to Vietnam the following year, signing on with East Asian Bank Football Club for a two-year stay. In 2004, he made his final move to SHB Đà Nẵng, where he stayed until his promotion to manager in 2008.

Coach/Manager
Lê Huỳnh Đức began coaching during his time with East Asian Bank football club, where he also worked as assistant manager. He continued in this role with Đà Nẵng F.C. until his promotion to Manager in 2008. The next year, he was nominated as assistant manager of Vietnam's national football team by Manager Calisto. Huỳnh Đức once again made history when he was named the V-League's Best Coach of the Month in March 2009, becoming the youngest coach to win the award. He received the same award in April and May of the same year, becoming the first coach ever to win the award for three consecutive months. His coaching is credited with helping SHB Đà Nẵng emerge as champions in the 2009 V-League and at the Vietnamese Cup in the same year.

International goals

Vietnam

Honours

Player

Club

Hồ Chí Minh City Police
V.League 1
 Winners : 1995

Manager

Club

SHB Đà Nẵng
V.League 1
 Winners : 2009, 2012
Vietnamese Super Cup
 Winners : 2009, 2012
Vietnamese National Cup
 Winners : 2009
BTV Cup
 Winners : 2008

Personal honours
Top goalscorer V.League 1: 1996, 1998
The only player to participate in 3 SEA Games football competition in a row (1995, 1997, 1999).
The only player to participate in 5 Tiger Cups (1996, 1998, 2000, 2002, 2004).
Vietnamese Golden Ball : 1995, 1997, 2002
Vietnamese Silver Ball  : 1998, 1999, 2000
Tiger Cup all-time topscorer with 14 goals
Asean Football Championship 3rd place overall top goalscorer
Manager of month in V-League 2009
Manager of Month in January and February in V-League 2010

Notes and references

External links

1972 births
Living people
Expatriate footballers in China
Sportspeople from Ho Chi Minh City
Vietnamese footballers
Chongqing Liangjiang Athletic F.C. players
SHB Da Nang FC players
Vietnam international footballers
Vietnamese expatriate footballers
Vietnamese expatriate sportspeople in China
Vietnamese football managers
Association football forwards
Southeast Asian Games silver medalists for Vietnam
Southeast Asian Games medalists in football
Competitors at the 1995 Southeast Asian Games
Competitors at the 1997 Southeast Asian Games
Competitors at the 1999 Southeast Asian Games
Footballers at the 1998 Asian Games
Asian Games competitors for Vietnam